Pontibacter xinjiangensis  is a Gram-negative, rod-shaped and aerobic and non-motile bacterium from the genus of Pontibacter which has been isolated from soil from Xinjiang in China.

References

External links
Type strain of Pontibacter xinjiangensis at BacDive -  the Bacterial Diversity Metadatabase

Cytophagia
Bacteria described in 2010